Butedale is a ghost town on Princess Royal Island, in British Columbia, Canada. It was founded in 1918 as a fishing, mining and logging camp.  Initially the salmon cannery was established by Western Packers which was purchased and operated by the Canadian Fishing Company until it ceased operating in the 1950s.  At its peak the summertime population of Butedale was over 400 people.

A post office was opened in Butedale in 1917, and closed March 4, 1974.

Background
There is a small dam which generates power from Butedale Lake immediately behind the town.  Impressive Butedale Falls flows out of the lake into the ocean immediately to the right of the wharves.  The Butedale Founders Association talked about restoring the town but it is quickly falling to ruin.

It is a popular point of interest for cruise ship and ferry passengers sailing the Inside Passage of British Columbia.  The site is accessible only by boat or floatplane.

Gallery

See also
Surf Inlet, British Columbia

References

External links

Youtube: Butedale Falls & Town seen from the Inside Passage

Ghost towns in British Columbia
Unincorporated settlements in British Columbia
North Coast of British Columbia
Populated places in the Regional District of Kitimat–Stikine